Belle's is an American sitcom that ran on TV One from February 1 until March 1, 2013.

Premise
The series encompasses the Cooper family who owns and operates an upscale soul food restaurant located in Atlanta. The series also encompasses widower William "Big Bill" Cooper as he moves on from his wife's passing and raises his two daughters: Jill and Loreta.

Cast
Keith David as William "Big Bill" Cooper
Elise Neal as Jill Cooper
Tami Roman as Loreta Cooper
Ella Joyce as Gladys Crawford
Miguel A. Núñez, Jr. as Maurice
Nadja Alaya as Pam

Episodes

References

External links
 

2010s American black sitcoms
2013 American television series debuts
2013 American television series endings
English-language television shows
Television series about families
Television shows set in Atlanta